John Edward Lovelock (5 January 1910 – 28 December 1949) was a New Zealand athlete who became the world 1500m and mile record holder and 1936 Olympic champion in the 1500 metres.

Early life

Lovelock was born in the town of Crushington (near Reefton) as the son of English immigrants.  From his early days at school he participated and excelled in fields beyond athletics. At Fairlie School (1919–23) he was dux of the primary school, represented the school in rugby, competed in swimming and athletics, and was a prefect. At Timaru Boys' High School, which he attended as a boarder from 1924, he set school athletics records but was also involved in nearly every area of school life. In 1928, his final year, Lovelock was school dux, head prefect, and won the school's boxing championship cup. The following year he went to University of Otago to study medicine. Lovelock showed a talent for sports while at the university, and competed for the university team in the New Zealand  championships. In 1931 he became a Rhodes Scholar at Exeter College, Oxford from 1931 to 1934. He graduated with an MB ChB degree as a medical practitioner.

Sports career

In 1932—by then holder of the British Empire record for the mile, at 4:12.0—Lovelock competed in the 1932 Summer Olympics in Los Angeles, and placed 7th in the final of the 1500 metres event, won by Luigi Beccali of Italy.

The following year, he set a world mile record of 4:07.6 when running at Princeton against its emerging champion Bill Bonthron. Later, in September, he represented New Zealand in the first World Student Games where he renewed his rivalry with Beccali, with Beccali winning.  In 1934 Lovelock won the gold medal in the mile (4:13.0) at the British Empire Games. He also lost some races, and believed that he could only make one supreme effort in a season.

The highlight of Lovelock's career came in 1936, when he won the gold medal in the 1500 m at the Berlin Olympics, setting a world record in the final (3:47.8). Lovelock had plotted ever since his defeat at Los Angeles and developed a revolutionary tactic. The race is regarded as one of the finest 1500 m Olympic finals and included one of the finest fields assembled. Hopefuls for the final included a culmination of contenders from the first great era of mile running from 1932–36 in which the world records for the 1500 m and mile had been broken several times. Apart from Lovelock, the potential rivals included the American mile world record holder Glenn Cunningham who had broken Lovelock's world record in 1934, as well as Bonthron, Beccali, and the emerging English champion Sydney Wooderson, all of whom hoped to line up to race in the Berlin Games. Bonthron, who held the world 1500m record, failed to make the US team, while Wooderson was found to have a fracture in his ankle and missed the final. The silver medalist in Los Angeles, John 'Jerry' Cornes, also raced in Berlin along with the Swedish champion Erik Ny, Canadian Phil Edwards, and American Gene Venzke, who had been regarded as the favourite for the 1932 title until injury denied him a place in the US team. In the final, Lovelock beat Cunningham, who came in second, by making the unprecedented break from 300 m out. Lovelock had been regarded as a sprinter in the home straight but cleverly disguised his plan and caught his opponents napping with a brilliantly timed move. Cunningham, who also broke the world record in the race, was considered by many to be the greatest American miler of all time. Beccali was third.

Lovelock, who was the captain of the New Zealand Olympic team, raced once more for the British Commonwealth after Berlin and his last race was back at Princeton en route to a Government-sponsored trip to New Zealand where he was beaten by another of the Olympic finalists, the American Archie San Romani (fourth in Berlin), with Cunningham third, rounding out the cast of a memorable period of middle-distance running. Lovelock maintained his interest in athletics until at least the outbreak of the Second World War as a newspaper contributor.

Later life
Lovelock was a major in the Royal Army Medical Corps during World War II. He married Cynthia James in 1945 and had two daughters. A year later, he began working at Manhattan Hospital in New York City. On 28 December 1949, he had telephoned his wife from work to inform her that he was coming home early because he was not feeling well.  He was waiting at the Church Avenue subway station in Brooklyn, New York, when he fell onto the tracks, probably as a result of one of the dizziness attacks to which he was subject after being thrown from a horse in 1940.  He was then killed by an oncoming train.

Posthumous commemorations
In 1990 the New Zealand post office issued a set of stamps featuring Lovelock along with George Nēpia.

The New Zealand Ministry for Culture and Heritage refers to a "Lovelock legend", and describes him as having "captured the imagination of New Zealanders and others. Streets, playing fields and sports bars have been named after him. He has inspired books, stamps, a stage play and a film. In 2002 a statue was erected at Timaru Boys High, where much of the memorabilia related to him is stored."

His Victory Oak from the 1936 Olympics was planted at Timaru Boys' High School in New Zealand, and is considered a nationally protected landmark.

The Lovelock Classic is an annual athletics meet held in Timaru, with the men's mile run as the feature event.

Lovelock Place, in the Hamilton suburb of Chartwell, is named in Lovelock's honour.

Bibliography 

The Legend of Lovelock by Norman Harris, A.H. & A.W. Reed, Wellington, New Zealand, 1964
Lovelock: New Zealand's Olympic gold miler by Christopher Tobin, Dunedin, 1984
Jack Lovelock - Athlete & Doctor by Dr Graeme Woodfield, Wellington, 2007
As If Running on Air: The Journals of Jack Lovelock edited by David Colquhoun, Wellington 2008
Conquerors of Time by Lynn McConnell, London, 2009
Lovelock by James McNeish

References

External links 

 
 
 Lovelock at NZonScreen (documentary film online)
 Extensive biography from the Dictionary of New Zealand
 Biography from 1966 Encyclopaedia of New Zealand
 
 Jack Lovelock Athlete & Doctor Latest Biography
 Jack Lovelock, photo after Mile of the Century in 1935
 

1910 births
1949 deaths
Accidental deaths in New York (state)
Alumni of Exeter College, Oxford
Athletes (track and field) at the 1932 Summer Olympics
Athletes (track and field) at the 1934 British Empire Games
Athletes (track and field) at the 1936 Summer Olympics
 
Commonwealth Games gold medallists for New Zealand 
Commonwealth Games medallists in athletics
World record setters in athletics (track and field)
Medalists at the 1936 Summer Olympics
New Zealand expatriate sportspeople in the United States
New Zealand male long-distance runners
New Zealand male middle-distance runners
New Zealand people of English descent
New Zealand Rhodes Scholars
Olympic athletes of New Zealand
Olympic gold medalists in athletics (track and field)
Olympic gold medalists for New Zealand
People educated at Timaru Boys' High School
People from Reefton
Royal Army Medical Corps officers
Railway accident deaths in the United States
University of Otago alumni
20th-century New Zealand medical doctors
British Army personnel of World War II
Medallists at the 1934 British Empire Games